Aloïs Catteau (11 August 1877 – 2 November 1939) was an early-twentieth-century Belgian road racing cyclist who participated in the inaugural 1903 Tour de France and finished tenth. His best result was the 1904 Tour de France, where he finished 3rd.

Major results

1903
 10th Overall Tour de France
1904
 3rd Overall Tour de France
 6th Paris–Roubaix
1905
 7th Paris–Roubaix
1906
 3rd Paris–Tourcoing
 6th Overall Tour de France
1907
 9th Overall Tour de France
1908
 7th Overall Tour of Belgium
 8th Paris-Bruxelles
1909
 6th Bol d'Or
1911
 6th Bol d'Or

Grand Tour general classification results timeline

References

External links 

Memoire du Cyclisme info on Alois Catteau

1877 births
1939 deaths
Sportspeople from Tourcoing
Belgian male cyclists
Cyclists from Hauts-de-France